Bonnie Lynn Bassler (born 1962) is an American molecular biologist; the Squibb Professor in Molecular Biology and chair of the Department of Molecular Biology at Princeton University; and a Howard Hughes Medical Institute Investigator.  She has researched cell-to-cell chemical communication in bacteria and discovered key insights into the mechanism by which bacteria communicate, known as quorum sensing. She has contributed to the idea that disruption of chemical signaling can be used as an antimicrobial therapy.  

Bassler has received numerous awards for her research, including the  Paul Ehrlich and Ludwig Darmstaedter Prize (2021),   the Pearl Meister Greengard Prize (2016), the L'Oreal-UNESCO award (2012), the Richard Lounsbery Award (2011), the Wiley Prize in Biomedical Sciences (2009), and a MacArthur Fellowship (2002).

She is an elected member of the National Academy of Sciences (as of 2006), a Foreign Member of the Royal Society (as of 2012), a former president of the American Society for Microbiology (2011) and served on the National Science Board with a term expiring May 10, 2016. She was an editor of the Annual Review of Genetics from 2012–2017.

Early life and education
Bassler was born in Chicago and raised in Danville, California. She began her career in science at 13 "as a veterinarian's assistant at the Miami Zoo and later at a local dog and cat clinic."  

Bassler entered the University of California, Davis as a major in veterinary sciences, but focused on genetics and biochemistry and received a Bachelor of Science in biochemistry. Bassler worked for UC Davis biochemistry and molecular medicine professor Frederic Troy, who assigned her to a bacteria research project. Within this project, Bassler characterized an enzyme in E. coli which cleaved sugars from various membrane glycoproteins. Bassler has stated that prokaryotes are "the perfect creatures to work on."  Bassler attended  Johns Hopkins University and received a PhD in biochemistry in 1990.

Her postdoctoral research was conducted at the Agouron Institute in La Jolla, California where she worked with Michael R. Silverman from 1990–1994. 
Silverman was the first to discover quorum sensing, by studying the marine bacterium Vibrio fischeri.  The glow-in-the-dark bacteria communicate chemically about their numbers and only give off light when a cohort is large enough to create an effective light source.  Bassler determined further that bacteria are "multilingual" and use  multiple chemical signal molecules to communicate with each other.

Since then, Bassler has also shown that bacteria use quorum sensing to differentiate self and other, a trait previously  thought to be limited to more highly evolved organisms.  Bassler has shown that viruses and host cells (such as human cells) as well as bacteria, use quorum sensing, and that the virulence of pathogenic bacteria is in part a result of quorum sensing. Bassler has developed anti-quorum-sensing strategies that, in animal models, halt infection from bacterial pathogens of global significance.  

In 1994, Bassler joined the Princeton faculty. She is currently the chair of the department of molecular biology and the Squibb Professor in molecular biology.  Her lab at Princeton University researches quorum sensing, the process of cell-cell communication in bacteria.

Bassler's exploration of the ways in which bacteria communicate and behave collectively can be seen as contributing to a paradigm shift in how scientists view the microbial world. Bassler's discoveries are said to "open new vistas in basic science, but are also of practical significance."  Bassler's research has contributed new and exciting strategies for treating bacterial disease. 
In 2002, the MacArthur Foundation awarded Bassler a fellowship in recognition of her contributions to the bacterial lexicon.

Research 

During her postdoctoral research, Bassler experimented with genetic manipulation of bioluminescent genes in V. harveyi bacteria and discovered that this bacteria had multiple molecules for quorum sensing. She found that these bacteria use quorum sensing to turn on and off a large number of genes in response to communications from other bacteria. These communications and responses allow bacteria of the same species and of different species to cooperate in a similar manner to multi-cellular organisms. She extended this research in series of experiments leading to the discovery that boron binding is used as a co-factor in communication. Boron is found in abundance in the oceans where V. harveyi is found.

Bassler's lab focuses on intra- and inter-species communication, self versus non-self recognition, information transferring, and population level cooperation.  Research topics include: How bacteria distinguish self from other: ligand-receptor interactions, Dynamics: small RNA regulation of quorum sensing, Biofilms under flow and the public goods dilemma, Manipulation of quorum sensing on demand, and microbiome quorum sensing and inter-kingdom communication.

Awards and honors
 2002 MacArthur Fellowship
 2004 Elected member of the American Association for the Advancement of Science
 2006 National Academy of Sciences
 2007 Fellow of the American Academy of Arts and Sciences
 2008 Special Recognition from the World Cultural Council
 2009 Wiley Prize in Biomedical Sciences
 2010 USA Science and Engineering Festival's Nifty Fifty Speakers, nominated by American Society for Microbiology
 2010–2016 National Science Board, nominated by President Barack Obama
 2011 Richard Lounsbery Award
 2011 L'Oréal-UNESCO For Women in Science Awards Laureate for North America
 2010–2011 President of the American Society for Microbiology
 2012 Member in the American Philosophical Society
 2014 American Society for Microbiology EMD Millipore Alice C. Evans Award
 2015 Shaw Prize in Life Science and Medicine
 2016 The FASEB Excellence in Science Award
 2016 Pearl Meister Greengard Prize
 2016 Max Planck Research Award
 2016 Elected member of the National Academy of Medicine
 2018 Dickson Prize
 2018 Ernst Schering Prize
 2020 Genetics Society of America Medal
 2020 Gruber Prize in Genetics 
 2021 Paul Ehrlich and Ludwig Darmstaedter Prize
 2022 Wolf Prize in Chemistry.

Selected works

References

External links

 A Biologist's Listening Guide to Bacteria -  All Things Considered interview
 Nova Science Now Profile: Bonnie Bassler
 
 TED Talk: How bacteria "talk" (TED2009)
Bonnie Bassler Seminar: Cell-Cell Communication
Bonnie Bassler Online Talk: Tiny Conspiracies

1962 births
Living people
American women biochemists
Fellows of the American Academy of Arts and Sciences
Howard Hughes Medical Investigators
Johns Hopkins University alumni
MacArthur Fellows
Richard-Lounsbery Award laureates
Members of the United States National Academy of Sciences
Foreign Members of the Royal Society
American molecular biologists
Scientists from Chicago
Princeton University faculty
University of California, Davis alumni
Women molecular biologists
L'Oréal-UNESCO Awards for Women in Science laureates
21st-century American women scientists
Fellows of the American Association for the Advancement of Science
Members of the American Philosophical Society
Members of the National Academy of Medicine
Fellows of the American Academy of Microbiology
American women academics
Annual Reviews (publisher) editors